Enchanted may refer to:

Film
 Enchanted (film), a 2007 Disney film
 Okouzlená or Enchanted, a 1942 Czech film
 Enchanted, a 1998 film featuring David Kaufman

Literature
 The Enchanted (play), a 1950 English play by Maurice Valency
 Enchanted, a comics series by Serena Valentino

Music
 Enchanted (Marc Almond album)
 Enchanted (Stevie Nicks album), a boxed set by Stevie Nicks
 Enchanted (soundtrack), the soundtrack album from the 2007 Disney film
 "Enchanted" (The Platters song) (1959)
 "Enchanted" (Taylor Swift song) (2010)
 "Enchanted", a 1997 song by Delerium from Karma
 "Enchanted", a 2007 song by Patrick Wolf from The Magic Position
Enchanted, a 2013 album by Emma Stevens

Other uses
 Enchanted (video game), a 2007 Nintendo DS game based on the Disney film

See also

 Ciudad Encantada (Spanish for 'Enchanted City'), a geological site near the city of Cuenca, Castile-La Mancha, Spain
 Enchant (disambiguation)
 Enchanted forest
 Enchanter (disambiguation)
 Enchantment (disambiguation)
 Enchantress (disambiguation)